Canon EOS 1200D is an 18.1 megapixel digital single-lens reflex camera (DSLR) announced by Canon on 11 February 2014. It is known as the EOS Kiss X70 in Japan, the EOS Rebel T5 in the Americas, and the EOS Hi in Korea. The 1200D is an entry-level DSLR that introduces an 18 MP sensor from the 700D and 1080p HD video to Canon's entry level DSLRs. It replaces the 1100D.

Canon announced in March 2016 that the 1200D was replaced by the 1300D.

Features 
 18.0 Megapixel CMOS (APS-C) image sensor
 Canon's DIGIC 4 Image Processor
 9-point AF points
 ISO 100 – 6400 (Expandable to H: 12800)
 Up to 3.0 fps Continuous Shooting
 Canon EF lens mount
  LCD monitor
 sRGB and Adobe RGB color spaces
 RAW, JPEG file formats 
 Full HD video recording 
 Compatible with GPS receiver GP-E2
 Canon RS-60E3 pin type for intervalometer.

References

External links

Canon EOS 1200D Product Page at Canon USA
Canon EOS 1200D Unboxing Video

1200D
Live-preview digital cameras
Cameras introduced in 2014